Agnidé Osséni (born 24 October 1995) is a Beninese football midfielder who plays for Soleil FC.

References

1995 births
Living people
Beninese footballers
Benin international footballers
AS Oussou Saka players
USS Kraké players
Soleil FC players
Association football midfielders